Agastisvarar Temple is a Siva temple in Killukudi in Nagapattinam district in Tamil Nadu (India).

Vaippu Sthalam
It is one of the shrines of the Vaippu Sthalams sung by Tamil Saivite Nayanar Sundarar.

Presiding deity
The presiding deity is Agastisvarar. The Goddess is known as Sivakamasundari.

Location
The temple is located in Kilvelur-Kacchinam road. This place is also known as Killikudi.

References

Hindu temples in Nagapattinam district
Shiva temples in Nagapattinam district